F.M. Cornog is an American songwriter, singer, self-taught musician, and home-recordist who records under the name East River Pipe. The New York Times describes Cornog as "the Brian Wilson of home recording."

Cornog was born in Norfolk, Virginia, and raised in Summit, New Jersey.  After high school, Cornog worked a series of menial jobs before succumbing to alcoholism,
drug abuse, mental illness, and eventual homelessness, ending up in the Hoboken train station.

During this time he met Astoria, Queens-resident Barbara Powers, and with Powers' support and label (Hell Gate), Cornog released some home-recorded cassettes and 7" singles under the name East River Pipe, which he chose after observing a sewage pipe spewing out raw waste into the East River. These initial 7" singles attracted the attention of UK-based Sarah Records who released his records from 1993 to 1996, making Cornog one of the few American artists ever signed to the label.

In the U.S., Cornog released his first LP, Shining Hours In A Can, on the Chicago-based micro-indie Ajax Records in 1994. A year later, he found a more permanent home on Merge Records, the Chapel Hill-based indie run by Mac McCaughan and Laura Ballance. Merge released Poor Fricky (1995), Mel (1996), The Gasoline Age (1999), Shining Hours In A Can (2002;reissue), Garbageheads On Endless Stun (2003), What Are You On? (2006), and We Live In Rented Rooms (2011).

Artists who have covered East River Pipe songs include David Byrne, Lambchop, The Mountain Goats, Waxahatchee, Okkervil River, The Pains of Being Pure at Heart, For Against, Mary Lou Lord, and others. Rolling Stone called Cornog "the most gifted of the new loners."

Discography

Albums

1994 Shining Hours in a Can (Ajax)
1994 Poor Fricky (Sarah,UK)
1995 Poor Fricky (Merge,US)
1996 Mel (Merge,US; Shinkansen,UK)
1999 The Gasoline Age (Merge)
2002 Shining Hours in a Can (Merge) (Reissue)
2003 Garbageheads on Endless Stun (Merge)
2006 What Are You On? (Merge)
2011 We Live in Rented Rooms (Merge)

EPs

1993 Goodbye California (Sarah)
1995 Even the Sun Was Afraid (Sarah)

Singles

1991 Axl or Iggy/Helmet On (Hell Gate)
1992 My Life Is Wrong/She's a Real Good Time (Hell Gate)
1992 Make a Deal with the City/Psychic Whore (Hell Gate)
1993 Helmet On (Sarah)
1993 She's a Real Good Time (Sarah)
1993 Firing Room/Hey, Where's Your Girl (Hell Gate)
1994 Ah Dictaphone/Hide My Life Away from You (Hell Gate)
1995 Bring on the Loser (Merge)
1996 Miracleland (Shinkansen)
1996 Kill the Action (Merge)

Cassette-only releases

1989 East River Pipe (Hell Gate, cassette tape)
1990 Point of Memory (Hell Gate, cassette tape) 
1991 I Used To Be Kid Colgate (Hell Gate, cassette tape)

Other media

Knockaround Guys American feature film directed by Brian Koppelman; East River Pipe's "Make A Deal With The City"

Down To The Bone American feature film Directed by Debra Granik; East River Pipe's "Arrival Pad #19" 

Lake City American feature film directed by Hunter Hill and Perry Moore; East River Pipe's "Bring On The Loser" 

"Drinking the Kool-Aid" an episode of the American television series Veronica Mars; East River Pipe's "Make A Deal With The City" 

World of Jenks American documentary series on MTV; East River Pipe's "Three Ships"

This Summer Feeling French feature film directed by Mikhaël Hers; East River Pipe's "Make A Deal With The City"

References

External links
Merge Records East River Pipe

New York magazine Interview
Perfect Sound Forever - East River Pipe

Sarah Records artists
Indie pop groups from New York (state)
Living people
Musical groups from New York (state)
Musicians from Summit, New Jersey
Year of birth missing (living people)
Merge Records artists